Gérard James is an American set decorator. He won an Academy Award in the category Best Art Direction for the film Dangerous Liaisons.

Selected filmography
 Dangerous Liaisons (1988)

References

External links

Year of birth missing (living people)
Living people
American set decorators
Best Art Direction Academy Award winners